The United States Military Academy (USMA) is an undergraduate college in West Point, New York that educates and commissions officers for the United States Army. The Academy is a member of the Division I Patriot League in most sports, but its men's ice hockey program competes in the Atlantic Hockey league and its football program competes independent of a league. The academy fields 24 club sports teams. In addition, about 65% of the cadets compete in intramural sports, known at the academy as "company athletics".

This list is drawn from alumni of the Military Academy who are athletes or athletic coaches. Eleven alumni have competed in the Olympic Games as athletes or coaches. The first was George S. Patton (class of 1909) in the modern pentathlon at the 1912 Summer Olympics. The most recent is Mike Krzyzewski (class of 1969), who was head coach of the U.S. men's basketball team at the 2016 Summer Olympics. Three alumni are recipients of college football's Heisman Trophy: Doc Blanchard (class of 1947), Glenn Davis (class of 1947), and Pete Dawkins (class of 1959). Bob Mischak (class of 1954)
was named No. 7 on NFL.com's list of Top Ten All Time NFL Players from service academies and was a 3x Super Bowl winner.
(Note – There are at least 2 others who were on the US Olympic Team Handball squad ... Craig Gilbert – '78; Pete Lash – '81 (who went on to garner MVP awards at the World Championship); and possibly Jim Thome – '68, as a long-time US team coach. / asst. coach.  Gilbert and Lash are both shown on the West Point wall of Olympic athletes at Kimsey Athletic Center, at the south end of Michie Stadium.  Gilbert participated in '84, and Lash in '84 and '88.)



Athletic figures
Note: "Class year" refers to the alumni's class year, which usually is the same year they graduated. However, in times of war, classes often graduate early.

Athletes

Coaches

References
General

Inline citations

West Point
Academy alumni, famous list
United States Army officers
At
Army Black Knights